Rayadurg Junction railway station is the primary railway station serving Rayadurg town in the Indian state of Andhra Pradesh. The station comes under the jurisdiction of Hubli railway division of South Western Railway zone. A new railway line connecting with Kalyandurg of Anantapur district was commissioned recently. It will be eventually extended to Tumkur.

References

Railway stations in Anantapur district